Kylie Mole is a fictional character created by Australian actor and comedian Mary-Anne Fahey. Kylie Mole is a scowling schoolgirl on The Australian TV show, The Comedy Company.

As well as performing monologue comedy segments on The Comedy Company, Mole interviewed various celebrities, including Julian Lennon, Sylvester Stallone, the band INXS and Kylie Minogue.

As well as appearing in The Comedy Company, Kylie Mole was also featured in the second series of the ABC's Kittson Fahey television show in 1993. In 2002, sixty minutes of footage of The Comedy Company was edited into a special called The Comedy Company: So Excellent, with the subtitle referencing a famed line by the Kylie Mole character.

Discography

Singles

Awards and nominations

ARIA Music Awards
The ARIA Music Awards are a set of annual ceremonies presented by Australian Recording Industry Association (ARIA), which recognise excellence, innovation, and achievement across all genres of the music of Australia. They commenced in 1987. 

! 
|-
| 1989 || "So Excellent" / "I Go I Go" || ARIA Award for Best Comedy Release ||  || 
|-

References

Comedy television characters
Television characters introduced in 1988
Australian comedy
Female characters in television